"Fenomen" is a song by the Yugoslav new wave band Šarlo Akrobata, from the album Bistriji ili tuplji čovek biva kad..., released in 1981.

Cover versions
 Serbian punk rock band Džukele covered the song live on the various artists album Punk You All in 1998.
 Električni Orgazam frontman Srđan Gojković "Gile" covered the song on the Jako dobar tattoo Milan Mladenović tribute album in 2002.

References

External links
 EX YU ROCK enciklopedija 1960-2006, Janjatović Petar; 

1981 songs